Scorpiorighting is the third and final studio album by New Zealand band Garageland, released in 2002.

Track listing
"Life Is So Sweet"
"Get Some"
"Been Around"
"Crazy"
"Superstars"
"Carry Me South"
"High Way"
"Gone"
"Rock And Roll Heart"
"Believe In You"
"Who the Hell Do You Think You Are?"
"Shine"

References

2002 albums
Garageland albums
Flying Nun Records albums